The 1936 United States Senate Special Election within the State of Iowa occurred on November 3rd, 1936, following the death of incumbent Senator Richard Louis Murphy in an automobile accident. Representative Guy Mark Gillette (D-IA) and Editor of the Chariton Herald-Patriot, Berry F. Halden(R-IA) were the two major party contenders in this election. George F. Buresh (FL-IA) and two other candidates also ran. The result of this election was Gillette beating out both other candidates, and winning with 52% of the votes cast.

Republican Primary 
Berry F. Halden won the Republican nomination at the Republican Party's State Convention on the fifth ballot, with 1,682 votes.  Other candidates within the primary were James R. Rhodes, a publisher for the Newton News, and Guy Linville, a lawyer from Cedar Rapids.

Democratic Primary 
Guy M. Gillette was named the Democratic Party's Candidate at the Democratic Party's State Convention.  Ray Murphy, Former National Commander of the American Legion, declined to contest the Primary.

Farmer-Labor Primary 
While the Farmer-Labor Party initially sought out and declared Former Republican Senator Smith W. Brookhart to be their nominee, Ernest R. Quick ran as their eventual candidate for the Special Election.

General Election

See also 

 1936 United States Senate elections

References 

1936
Iowa
United States Senate
Iowa Senate 1936
Iowa 1936
United States Senate 1936